Secret Evil is the debut studio album by American soul/pop band Jessica Hernandez & the Deltas. It was released on August 19, 2014 through Instant Records after a two-year delay due to a record company merger.

Critical reception

Secret Evil received positive reviews from music critics. Cole Waterman from Pop Matters says Secret Evil is "one of 2014’s most deftly sequenced, produced, written and performed albums." Jim Vorel of Paste Magazine calls Jessica Hernandez "an ascendant star." Kevin "Skwerl" Cogill of antiquiet seemed blown away by the album saying, "every once in awhile, something indisputably special wanders into our yard and stops us dead in our tracks."

Track listing

References

2014 albums
Jessica Hernandez & the Deltas albums